Syrians in Turkey, includes Turkish citizens of Syrian origin, Syrian refugees, and other Syrian citizens resident in Turkey. As of January 2023 there are more than 3,500,000 registered refugees of the Syrian Civil War in Turkey, which hosts the biggest refugee population in the whole world. In addition, more than 100,000 Syrian nationals reside in Turkey with a residence permit. Apart from Syrian refugees under temporary protection and Syrian citizens with a residence permit; 223,881 Syrian nationals were given Turkish citizenship as of December 2022.

Syrians are generally concentrated in the border provinces and major cities in Turkey, and only 1.3% of them live in refugee camps. Istanbul, the most populous city in Turkey, hosts the highest number of Syrian refugees, with approximately 550,000 registered people.

History 
Syrians in Turkey include migrants from Syria to Turkey, as well as their descendants. The number of Syrians in Turkey is estimated at 4 million people as of August 2022, and consists mainly of refugees of the Syrian Civil War.

In 2017, Syrian citizens accounted for 24% of all work permits granted to foreign nationals, making Syrians the largest single group of foreign nationals with work permits.

Following the Turkish military intervention in the Afrin District in Northern Syria against the Kurdish YPG militia, some Turkish politicians have suggested that Syrian refugees in Turkey should be repatriated to Syria.

According to news releases in 2019; there are 405,521 Syrians born in Turkey since 2011, 79,820 Syrians who got Turkish citizenship, approximately 329,000 Syrians who returned to Syria, 31,185 Syrians who have working permits, and 15,159 companies which have at least one Syrian company member.

As of October 2022; 526,932 Syrian refugees have returned to Syria.

Ethnic groups 

Syrians living in Turkey are formed of various ethnic and religious groups. The majority are Arabs (including Palestinians) while Syrian Kurds and Syrian Turkmen make up the significant minorities. It is estimated by the UNHCR that more than 80% of the Syrian population in Turkey are ethnic Arabs, while 10-15% of them are ethnic Kurds and 10-15% of them are ethnic Turks (Syrian Turkmen). The same report indicates that 81%, 16.1% and 13.3% state their native languages as Arabic, Kurdish and Turkish, respectively. (More than one option was available.)

Arabs

Kurds

Turkmen 

By December 2016 the Turkish Foreign Ministry Undersecretary Ümit Yalçın stated that Turkey opened its borders to 500,000 Syrian Turkmen.

In 2020 the Voice of America reported that 1,000,000 Syrian Turkmen (including descendants) who are living in Turkey are requesting to become Turkish citizens.

Assyrians 

Some Assyrians who have fled from ISIL have found temporary homes in the city of Midyat. A refugee center is located near Midyat, but due to there being a small Assyrian community in Midyat, many of the Assyrian refugees at the camp went to Midyat hoping for better conditions than what the refugee camp had. To their supine, many refugees were in fact given help and accommodations by the local Assyrian community there, perhaps wishing that the refugees stay, as the community in Midyat is in need of more members.

Circassians

Education 

 there are 1.7 million Syrian refugee children in the country, and since 2017 the government has committed to integrating them into the national school system.

Economics 
 the trade minister said there were almost 14,000 Syrian owned businesses, which was almost 30% of the total number of foreign owned businesses, with a capital of 4 billion Turkish liras ($480 million). About 40% of businesses are estimated to be jointly owned with Turks or other nationals.

Other claims of population 
Ümit Özdağ, chairman of Victory Party, alleged that number of Syrian population who gained Turkish citizenship is 1,476,368  as of July 2022. He also claims number of Syrians in Turkey is about 5.3 million including unregistered ones.

See also 
 Arabs in Turkey
 Syrian Turkmen
 Syrians in Jordan
 Syrians in Lebanon
 United Nations High Commissioner for Refugees

Notes

References

External links 
Syrian diaspora at Flickr Commons

 
Ethnic groups in Turkey
Syrian diaspora in Asia
Refugees of the Arab Winter
Refugees of the Syrian civil war
Syrian diaspora in the Middle East
Syrian diaspora in Europe